Rezki Amrouche (born November 17, 1970) is an Algerian football manager and former player. As a player, he played 34 times for the Algerian National Team, scoring 2 goals.

Managerial career
On October 24, 2011, Amrouche was appointed as manager of Algerian Ligue Professionnelle 2 side USM Blida.

Honours
Club:
 Won the Algerian League once with JS Kabylie in 1995
 Won the African Cup Winners Cup once with JS Kabylie in 1995
 Won the Arab Champions League once with Club Africain in 1997
 Won the Tunisia Cup twice with Club Africain in 1998 
 Won the CAF Cup once with JS Kabylie in 2000
 Won the Algerian Second Division once with OMR El Annasser in 2006
 Finalist of the African Cup Winners Cup once with Club Africain in 1999
Country:
 Finalist at the 1993 Mediterranean Games in France
 Participated in the African Cup of Nations twice in 1996 and 2000 reaching the quarter-finals both times

References

External links

1970 births
1996 African Cup of Nations players
2000 African Cup of Nations players
Living people
Algeria international footballers
Algeria under-23 international footballers
Mediterranean Games silver medalists for Algeria
Competitors at the 1993 Mediterranean Games
Algerian expatriate footballers
Algerian expatriate sportspeople in France
Algerian expatriate sportspeople in Tunisia
Algerian footballers
Algerian football managers
Club Africain players
Expatriate footballers in France
Expatriate footballers in Tunisia
JS Kabylie players
Stade Brestois 29 players
NA Hussein Dey players
JSM Béjaïa players
USM Blida players
OMR El Annasser players
Olympique de Médéa managers
USM Blida managers
Association football defenders
Mediterranean Games medalists in football
21st-century Algerian people